Terence O'Grady (10 April 1934 – 12 January 1987) was an English professional rugby league footballer who played in the 1950s and 1960s.

Career
O'Grady won caps for England while at Oldham in 1952 against Wales, in 1955 against Other Nationalities, and won caps for Great Britain while at Oldham on the 1954 Great Britain Lions tour against Australia (2 matches), and New Zealand (3 matches), and while at Warrington in 1961 against New Zealand.

About Terry O'Grady's time, there was Oldham's 2-12 defeat by Barrow in the 1954 Lancashire County Cup Final during the 1954–55 season at Station Road, Swinton on Saturday 23 October 1954, the 10-3 victory over St. Helens in the 1956 Lancashire County Cup Final during the 1956–57 season at Station Road, Swinton on Saturday 20 October 1956, and played , i.e. number 5, and scored a try in Wigan's 8-13 defeat by Oldham in the 1957 Lancashire County Cup Final during the 1957–58 season at Station Road, Swinton on Saturday 19 October 1957.

In his 1957 début match for Wigan O'Grady scored a hat-trick of tries. he played  in Wigan's 13–9 victory over Workington Town in the 1958 Challenge Cup Final during the 1957–58 season at Wembley Stadium, London on Saturday 10 May 1958, in front of a crowd of 66,109.

Terry O'Grady scored 28-tries for Warrington during the 1961–62 season.

Death
On 10 January 1987, O'Grady collapsed in the car park following the final of the 1986–87 John Player Trophy at Burnden Park, Bolton. On 12 January 1987, he died, aged 52.

References

External links
Statistics at orl-heritagetrust.org.uk
Statistics at wigan.rlfans.com
Statistics at wolvesplayers.thisiswarrington.co.uk

1934 births
1987 deaths
England national rugby league team players
English rugby league players
Great Britain national rugby league team players
Lancashire rugby league team players
Oldham R.L.F.C. players
Rugby league players from Oldham
Rugby league wingers
Warrington Wolves players
Wigan Warriors players